Priscilla Wright may refer to:

 Priscilla Wright (born 1943), Playboys Playmate of the Month in March 1966
 Priscilla Wright (singer) (born 1940), Canadian singer